Gonon may refer to:

People
 François Gonon (born 1979), French orienteering competitor
 Philipp Gonon (born 1955), Swiss educationist

Places
 
 Gonon, Guinea